Finola is a hemp variety used to produce hemp oil.

It is the first oilseed variety of hemp recognized by Canada and EU, and the first variety developed for use as a grain, instead of a fiber.
, Finola was the most popular variety grown in Canada.

Formerly named 'FIN-314', then marketed as Finola, the cultivar is a cross of two northern Russian landraces that were obtained from the Vavilov Institute of Plant Industry. The developers of the variety thought the parent stock may have been Cannabis ruderalis. It is short in stature at 1.5 m when mature, making it amenable to machine harvesting. Combine harvesters suitable for grain can also be used to harvest Finola without modification.

References

Sources

 (CC-BY-4.0)

Further reading

Hemp agriculture
Food plant cultivars